Jahan Bakhsh may refer to:
 Jahan Bakhsh, Kohgiluyeh and Boyer-Ahmad
 Jahan Bakhsh, Sistan and Baluchestan
 Alireza Jahanbakhsh, Iranian footballer